Mardy Fish and John Isner were the defending champions, but neither participated this year.

Jordan Kerr and Rajeev Ram won the title, defeating Michael Kohlmann and Rogier Wassen 6–7(6–8), 7–6(9–7), [10–6] in the final.

Seeds

Draw

Draw

External links
Draw

Doubles